One Last Wish was a short-lived post-hardcore band from Washington, D.C. It was formed in May 1986 by members of Rites of Spring, and split up in January 1987.

Amidst the breakup of Rites of Spring in 1986, three of its four members – Picciotto, Janney and Canty – went on to form a new band after picking up Michael Hampton, former guitarist of the Faith and Embrace. With the name One Last Wish the band began playing shows in August 1986, which were mostly in the D.C. area and included a series of benefit shows. Their sole recording was done in November 1986 at Inner Ear Studios in Arlington, Virginia. It was engineered by Don Zientara and produced by Ian MacKaye.

After the dissolution of the band, both Canty and Picciotto would join MacKaye in the band Fugazi. One Last Wish broke up shortly after mixing was completed, and as a result the album was not released until 13 years later in November 1999, on MacKaye's Dischord Records label; Dischord had decided against the release in light of their growing reputation as a label of defunct bands. Prior to the release of this record, titled 1986, only one song, "Burning in the Undertow", had been released, having been on the Dischord benefit sampler "State of the Union" (April 1989). Twenty years after the 1999 release of 1986 material, the song "My Better Half" was listed by Vulture.com as number 81 of the 100 greatest emo songs.

After the band's breakup, Picciotto, Janney and Canty would reunite with Michael Fellows of Rites of Spring, taking on the new name Happy Go Licky. Hampton would go on to form the band Manifesto.

Discography
 1986 Dischord Records (1999)

References

American post-hardcore musical groups
American emo musical groups
Punk rock groups from Washington, D.C.
Dischord Records artists
First-wave emo bands